Skagsudde, is a Swedish lighthouse. It was built to replace to old light station Skag located on the island Gråklubben nearby.

History
Skag lighthouse was designed by engineer Nils Gustaf von Heidenstam and lit in 1877 and is now relocated complete with a Fresnel lens as a tourist attraction outside the town of Piteå.

The modern tower is of typical 1950's functionalistic design and its top holds many antennas and communications gear. Skagsudde is frequently reported as a weather station in shipping news by the Swedish Meteorological and Hydrological Institute. It is owned and remote-controlled by the Swedish Maritime Administration. It is the main lighthouse to reach the ports of Örnsköldsvik and Husum.

Climate
Skagsudde has a humid continental climate due to recent mildening of the climate. It retains strong maritime influence, resulting in cool summers and  milder winters than in surrounding interior low-lying areas. As typical of east coast maritime stations in Sweden, precipitation is generally low even though the climate is humid.

See also

 List of lighthouses and lightvessels in Sweden

References

External links

 Sjofartsverket  
 The Swedish Lighthouse Society

Lighthouses completed in 1957
Lighthouses in Sweden